Leif Andersson (born 27 December 1944) is a Finnish rower. He competed in the men's coxed pair event at the 1972 Summer Olympics.

References

External links
 

1944 births
Living people
Finnish male rowers
Olympic rowers of Finland
Rowers at the 1972 Summer Olympics
People from Porvoo
Sportspeople from Uusimaa